The 2009 Duke Blue Devils football team represented Duke University in the 2009 NCAA Division I FBS football season. It was Duke's 57th season as a member of the Atlantic Coast Conference (ACC) and fifth in its Coastal Division. The Blue Devils were led by second-year head coach David Cutcliffe. Duke finished the season 5–7 overall and 3–5 in ACC play, failing to qualify for a bowl game for the 15th straight season.

Schedule

Personnel

Coaching staff

Roster

Game summaries

Richmond

at Army

at No. 22 Kansas

North Carolina Central

No. 6 Virginia Tech

at NC State

Maryland

at Virginia

at North Carolina

No. 7 Georgia Tech

at No. 21 Miami (FL)

Wake Forest

Notes
When the Blue Devils defeated the Maryland Terrapins on October 24, it marked the first time Duke had beaten consecutive ACC opponents since 1994.

References

Duke
Duke Blue Devils football seasons
Duke Blue Devils football